XETUL-AM is a radio station in Tultitlán on 1080 kHz, owned by the government of the State of Mexico. It is the only radio transmitter in the Radio y Televisión Mexiquense system aimed at the Mexico City area. Most programming originates from the main stations in Metepec.

XETUL broadcasts with 5,000 watts daytime and 250 watts nighttime on the AM frequency of 1080 kHz.

References

Radio stations established in 1983
Radio stations in Mexico City
Radio stations in the State of Mexico
Public radio in Mexico
Tultitlán